Harumi Tsuyuzaki (露崎春女, aka Lyrico; born April 11, 1974 in Kawasaki, Kanagawa, Japan) is a female Japanese pop, R&B, soul singer and songwriter. Shortly after her debut in 1995, she achieved a fame as an extraordinarily talented singer. With her astonishing vocal skills and unique songwriting talent, Harumi has captivated her fans for more than a decade.

Discography

Singles
 Time (Oct 25, 1995)
 Need You Badly (Feb 25, 1996)
 Feel You (Sep 5, 1996)
 Forever In Your Heart (Feb 5, 1997)
 Taiyou (May 21, 1997)
 Wish (Nov 6, 1997)
 Feel So Real (Jul 23, 1998)
 Believe Yourself (Oct 21, 1998)
 Break On Out (Nov 26, 1999)
 Snow (Jan 26, 2000)
 Jyounetsu No Taiyou (Dec 6, 2000)
 Prayer (Feb 7, 2001)
 Tears In Christmas (Nov 21, 2001)
 True Romance (Jan 23, 2002)
 Eternity (May 22, 2002)
 Kiseki No Hana (Sep 19, 2002)
 Lost Wing (Nov 19, 2003)
 Ageha (Jul 7, 2004)
 The Song of Life -Hikarinouta- w/Yuji Toriyama (Jan 18, 2006)

Albums
 Harumi Tsuyuzaki (Nov 25, 1995)
 Wonder Of Dream (Sep 5, 1996)
 Wonder Of Love (Feb 17, 1997)
 Thank You! (Aug 6, 1997)
 Believe Yourself (Aug 26, 1998)
 Especial Best Of 1995-1998 (Mar 17, 1999)
 Groove Remixes (Jun 18, 1999)
 Ballads (Dec 1, 1999)
 As I Am (Jan 26, 2000)
 Tender Lights (Feb 20, 2002)
 Voices of Grace (Nov 20, 2002)
 Flavours (May 12, 2004)
 Golden Best (Jan 26, 2005)
 13years (Oct 22, 2008)
 Now Playing (Apr 20, 2011)
 Respect (Jul 18, 2012)
 Love Naturally (Dec 11, 2013)

See also
 An Music School

References

External links
Harumi Tsuyuzaki/Lyrico - Official Website
Sony Music Online Japan:Harumi Tsuyuzaki/Lyrico - Official Website

1974 births
Living people
Sony Music Entertainment Japan artists
Japanese musicians
People from Kawasaki, Kanagawa
Musicians from Kanagawa Prefecture